The 2021 Six Nations Under 20s Championship was the 14th series of the Six Nations Under 20s Championship, the annual northern hemisphere rugby union championship. Due to the COVID-19 pandemic all the matches were played at Cardiff Arms Park, Cardiff.

The 2020 tournament was suspended with three games left to play, due to the COVID-19 pandemic and cancelled in August with no winner announced.

Participants

Table

Table ranking rules
 Four match points are awarded for a win.
 Two match points are awarded for a draw.
 A bonus match point is awarded to a team that scores four or more tries in a match or loses a match by seven points or fewer. If a team scores four tries in a match and loses by seven points or fewer, they are awarded both bonus points.
 Three bonus match points are awarded to a team that wins all five of their matches (known as a Grand Slam). This ensures that a Grand Slam winning team always ranks over a team who won four matches in which they also were awarded four try bonus points and were also awarded two bonus points in the match that they lost.
 Tie-breakers
 If two or more teams are tied on match points, the team with the better points difference (points scored less points conceded) is ranked higher.
 If the above tie-breaker fails to separate tied teams, the team that scored the higher number of total tries in their matches is ranked higher.
 If two or more teams remain tied for first place at the end of the championship after applying the above tiebreakers, the title is shared between them.

Fixtures

Week 1

Week 2

Week 3

Week 4

Week 5

References

External links
 Under-20 Six Nations 

2021
2021 rugby union tournaments for national teams
2020–21 in English rugby union
2020–21 in French rugby union
2020–21 in Irish rugby union
2020–21 in Italian rugby union
2020–21 in Scottish rugby union
2020–21 in Welsh rugby union
Under 20
June 2021 sports events in the United Kingdom
July 2021 sports events in the United Kingdom